Desulforhopalus vacuolatus is a moderately psychrophilic and sulfate-reducing bacterium from the genus of Desulforhopalus which has been isolated from marine sediments from Kysing Fjord in Denmark.

References

Bacteria described in 1999
Desulfobacterales